The martyr Mirax (fl. 7th century) was raised by Christian parents in the city of Tanis, Egypt. He renounced his faith to enter the service of an emir, to the great grief of his family. Mirax's parents resorted to prayer with great devotion for the redemption of their son. Mirax returned to his family and after much counsel and decided to publicly declare his return to the Christian faith. Consequently, Saint Mirax was tortured, beheaded, and his body cast into the sea.

Saint Mirax is celebrated by the Eastern Christian Churches on 11 December.

See also

Anthony the Great
Mary of Egypt
Forty Martyrs of Sebaste
Coptic Orthodox Church

References

Egyptian Christian saints
7th-century Christian saints
7th-century Egyptian people
Tanis